Stefan Milojević may refer to:

 Stefan Milojević (footballer, born January 1989), Serbian football attacking midfielder for Teleoptik, Voždovac, Banat Zrenjanin, Borac Čačak, Bežanija, Novi Pazar, Kokkolan, Kolubara, and Trayal Kruševac
 Stefan Milojević (footballer, born February 1989), Serbian football midfielder for Chênois, Menton, Corte, Geyland International and Woodlands Wellington
 Stefan Milojević (footballer, born 1991), Serbian-French football defender for Teleoptik, Košice, Borča, Bežanija, Airdrieonians, Greenock Morton, and ViOn Zlaté Moravce